Beau Flynn (born March 23, 1970) is an American film producer. He is best known for producing blockbuster films such as Skyscraper, Rampage, San Andreas, and Hercules, all of which starred Dwayne Johnson. Flynn has also produced independent films, including Requiem for a Dream, Tigerland, Choke, and The House of Yes. He has been married to film actress Marley Shelton since 2001 and they have two daughters.

Career 
Flynn has been a member of The Academy of Motion Picture Arts and Sciences and the Producers Guild of America for over 18 years. His first job in the industry was as an executive assistant to producer Scott Rudin. 
 
Flynn has often worked with actor Dwayne Johnson, including on the 2018 action films Skyscraper and Rampage.
 
Flynn's 2015 release, San Andreas, based on his own original idea, was New Line Cinema and Warner Bros. most successful film of the year, grossing $475 million worldwide. A few of FPC's other titles include: Baywatch, Hansel & Gretel: Witch Hunters, Journey 2: The Mysterious Island, The Rite, and Journey to the Center of the Earth.

Flynn produced the Disney film Jungle Cruise, based on the iconic theme park ride, which began shooting in May 2018. This was Flynn's seventh collaboration with Johnson, who also starred with Emily Blunt. After Jungle Cruise, Flynn and Johnson collaborated again with Rawson Marshall Thurber on the film Red Notice, an international action-thriller
they produced for Netflix.

Future projects 
FPC's future projects include: an adaptation of DC Comic's Black Adam, which will star Johnson, An Incident at Fort Bragg, a supernatural thriller based on a true story, Stillwater, an original sci-fi thriller, The 37th Parallel, and Seven Wonders, both based on Ben Mezrich novels; Road to Oz, a biography of L. Frank Baum, the author of The Wonderful Wizard of Oz.

FlynnPictureCo. 

FlynnPictureCo is under a three-year overhead deal with New Line Cinema and Warner Bros. Pictures, where the banner has had a deal for over 12 years. FlynnPictureCo's staff includes Senior Vice President Scott Sheldon and Creative Executives Chanel Bowling and Shelby Thomas.

Personal life 
Flynn and actress Marley Shelton married in July 2001. Their first daughter, West Flynn, was born on September 6, 2009. Ruby Jeanne Flynn, their second daughter, was born on May 1, 2012.

Filmography 
He was a producer in all films unless otherwise noted.

Film

Miscellaneous crew

Thanks

Television

References

External links 

 

Living people
American film producers
Place of birth missing (living people)
1970 births